Keshpur Assembly constituency is an assembly constituency in Paschim Medinipur district in the Indian state of West Bengal. It is reserved for scheduled castes.

Overview
As per orders of the Delimitation Commission, No. 235 Keshpur Assembly constituency  (SC) is composed of the following: Keshpur community development block.

Keshpur Assembly constituency is part of No. 32 Ghatal (Lok Sabha constituency). It Was Earlier Part of Panskura (Lok Sabha constituency) till 2009.

Members of Legislative Assembly

Election results

2021

2016
In the 2016 election, Seuli Saha of Trinamool Congress defeated his nearest rival Rameswar Dolui of CPI(M).

  

.# Swing calculated on Congress+Trinamool Congress vote percentages taken together in 2006.

2011
In the 2011 election, Rameswar Dolui of CPI(M) defeated his nearest rival Rajani Kanta Dolui of Congress.

  

.# Swing calculated on Congress+Trinamool Congress vote percentages taken together in 2011.

2006
In the 2006 election, Rameswar Dolui of CPI(M) defeated his nearest rival Asis Pramanik of Trinamool Congress.

  

.# Swing calculated on BJP+Trinamool Congress vote percentages taken together in 2006.

2001
In the 2001 election, Nanda Rani Dal of CPI(M) defeated his nearest rival Rajani Kanta Doloi of  Trinamool Congress.

.# Swing calculated on Congress+Trinamool Congress vote percentages taken together in 2001.

1996
In the 1996 election, Nanda Rani Dal of CPI(M) defeated his nearest rival Sannyasi Dolai of Congress.

.# Swing calculated on Congress+Trinamool Congress vote percentages taken together in 2001.

1991
In the 1991 election, Nanda Rani Dal of CPI(M) defeated his nearest rival Balai Chandra Paria of Jharkhand Party.

.# Swing calculated on Congress+Trinamool Congress vote percentages taken together in 2001.

1987
In the 1987 election, Himangshu Kumar of CPI(M) defeated his nearest rival Rajani Kanta Dolai of Congress.

.# Swing calculated on Congress+Trinamool Congress vote percentages taken together in 2001.

1982
In the 1982 election, Himangshu Kumar of CPI(M) defeated his nearest rival Rajani Kanta Dolai of Congress.

.# Swing calculated on Congress+Trinamool Congress vote percentages taken together in 2001.

1977
In the 1982 election, Rajanai Kanta Dolui of Congress defeated his nearest rival Ajoy Kumar Dolui of CPIM.

.# Swing calculated on Congress+Trinamool Congress vote percentages taken together in 2001.

1977-2006
In the 2006 state assembly elections, Rameswar Doloi of CPI(M) won the Keshpur (SC) assembly seat defeating his nearest rival Asish Pramanik of Trinamool Congress. Contests in most years were multi cornered but only winners and runners are being mentioned. Nanda Rani Dal of CPI(M) defeated Rajani Kanta Doloi of Trinamool Congress in 2001, Sannyasi Dolai of Congress in 1996, and Balai Chandra Parija of Jharkhand Party in 1991. Himansu Kumar of CPI(M) defeated Rajani Kanta Doloi of Congress in 1987 and 1982. Rajani Kanta Doloi of Congress defeated Ajoy Kumar Dolui of CPI(M) in 1977.

1951-1972
Rajani Kanta Doloi of Congress won in 1972 and 1971. Gangapada Kuar of Bangla Congress won in 1969. Rajani Kanta Doloi of Congress won in 1967. Bankim Roy of Congress won in 1962. The Keshpur seat did not exist in 1957. In independent India's first election in 1951, Nagendra Doloi of CPI won the Keshpur seat.

References

Assembly constituencies of West Bengal
Politics of Paschim Medinipur district